Ramiz Abutalıb oğlu Abutalibov (27 October 1937 – 1 January 2022) was an Azerbaijani historian and diplomat.

Life and career 
Born in Kirovabad, Abutalibov graduated in geology at the Baku State University, and worked at the State Committee on Science and Technology of the Council of Ministers of the Azerbaijan Soviet Socialist Republic and at the USSR Ministry of Foreign Affairs. In 1972 he was employed by UNESCO, for which he organized several conferences and exhibitions about Azerbaijani culture. He was a member of the Azerbaijani parliament during the USSR tenure, and in 1993 served as ambassador-at-large for the Ministry of Foreign Affairs and as Secretary-General of the Azerbaijan's Commission for UNESCO. 

His activity as historian was mainly focused on Azerbaijani emigration in France, and among his major works there was the 4-volume book Paris Archive. 1919-1940, that he edited in collaboration with the French-Georgian researcher Georges Mamulia.

During his life Abutalibov was the recipient of several awards and accolades, including the French Legion of Honour and a Medal of Pushkin for his services in the development of culture and art. He died in Moscow on 1 January 2022, at the age of 84.

References

External links
 Ramiz Abutalibov in International Biographical Bank of Azerbaijanis

1937 births
2022 deaths
Azerbaijani diplomats
20th-century Azerbaijani historians
People from Ganja, Azerbaijan
Recipients of the Legion of Honour
Recipients of the Medal of Pushkin
Burials at II Alley of Honor
Baku State University alumni